Dhanpat Rai Nahar (1919 - 2009) was an Indian politician and trade unionist. He was the joint secretary of the All India Agricultural Workers Union 1982-1992 and vice president of the organisation 1992-2003. He was a member of the Punjab State Committee of the Communist Party of India (Marxist) until 2004.

Nahar hailed from a Hindu(kshtriya) family from Jalandhar District, Punjab. During his school years, he fought against caste-based meal segregation and men/women inequalities in society.During the Second World War he was sent to Singapore, and became a 2nd Lieutenant in the British Army. He came to join the Indian National Army. Nahar was arrested during the Manipur campaign of the INA. He was jailed until 1948.

After his release from prison, Nahar joined the Communist Party of India. He became a leader of the rural workers movement. He was the founding general secretary of Bharatiya Khet Mazdoor Union in Punjab. When the CPI was divided in 1964, he sided with the CPI(M). He became president of the Punjab unit of the AIAWU (the rural workers front of CPI(M)).

References

Trade unionists from Punjab, India
Communist Party of India (Marxist) politicians from Punjab, India
1919 births
2009 deaths